Unity High School (Unity) is an independent charter high school in Oakland, California. The school opened in the fall (autumn) of 2003 and currently enrolls about 350 ninth to twelfth grade students. The principal is William Nee and the assistant principal is Braxton Lethco.

External links
Unity High School website

High schools in Oakland, California
Charter high schools in California
2003 establishments in California